Bois may refer to:
 Bois, Charente-Maritime, France
 Bois, West Virginia, United States
 Bois d'Arc, Texas, United States
 Les Bois, Switzerland
 Landskrona BoIS, a Swedish professional football club
 Tranås BoIS, a Swedish sports club

People with the surname Bois
 Cécile Bois (born 1971), French actress
 Curt Bois (1901–1991), German actor
 Danny Bois (born 1983), Canadian ice hockey player
 Désiré Georges Jean Marie Bois (1856–1946), French botanist
 Guy Bois (1934–2019), French historian
 John Bois (1560–1643), English scholar
 Jon Bois (born 1982), American sportswriter
 Mathieu Bois (born 1988), Canadian swimmer
 Rob du Bois (1934–2013), Dutch composer and jurist

See also 
 
 
 Boise (disambiguation)
 Boy (disambiguation)
 Dubois (disambiguation)
 Grand Bois (disambiguation)
 Petit Bois (disambiguation)